Women's events at the Artistic Gymnastics World Cup were first held at the 1975 FIG Artistic Gymnastics World Cup.

Three medals are awarded: gold for first place, silver for second place, and bronze for third place. Tie breakers have not been used in every year. In the event of a tie between two gymnasts, both names are listed, and the following position (second for a tie for first, third for a tie for second) is left empty because a medal was not awarded for that position. If three gymnastics tied for a position, the following two positions are left empty.

Medalists

References

All-around, individual, women
Artistic Gymnastics World Cup, all-around, individual